Émile Moreau may refer to:
Émile Moreau (playwright) (1852 – 1922), French playwright
Émile Moreau (politician) (1877–1959), Canadian politician
Émile Moreau (banker) (1868–1950), French banker